= Digri railway station =

Railway station in Sindh, Pakistan

Digri railway station ڊگهڙي ريلوي اسٽيشن

General information
- Owner: Ministry of Railways

Other information
- Station code: DII

History
- Former names: Great Indian Peninsula Railway

Digri railway station (Urdu: ڈگری ریلوے اسٹیشن, Sindhi: ڊگهڙي ريلوي اسٽيشن) is located in Sindh, Pakistan.

== See also ==
- List of railway stations in Pakistan
- Pakistan Railways
